is a main character from Nintendo's Pikmin video game series created by Shigeru Miyamoto. He first appeared in Pikmin (2001), which led to the development of three additional games; two of them featuring Olimar as the protagonist.

Olimar also appears in other Nintendo games, being a playable character in the Super Smash Bros. series beginning with its third entry. Reception to the character has been positive both for his appearance in Pikmin and Super Smash Bros.

Creation and design
Olimar was named after Mario; in Japanese, the name "Olimar" (オリマー) is almost "Mario" (マリオ) spelled backwards. Captain Olimar was a late addition in Pikmin; Shigeru Miyamoto said that since initially during the original development the Pikmin would be utilized as weapons to be shot by the player themselves, "it wouldn't be interesting enough" to have a player character. Although Olimar himself was a late addition to Pikmin, Olimar's role as the leader of the Pikmin was included since the original conception of the game. In an interview with The Telegraph, Miyamoto stated that he  "started thinking about a game about lots of small people carrying things in a line, following a leader, with everyone going in the same direction." This "leader" would eventually become Olimar.

Appearances

Pikmin
Captain Olimar was introduced in the first installment of the series, Pikmin (2001), where he is a pilot who works for Hocotate Freight. During a travel, his cargo transport spacecraft, the S.S. Dolphin collides with a meteor and lands in a new planet. To manage to escape and go home, he uses the native species of anthropomorphic plants—the Pikmin—to help him find the 30 parts of his ship in the 30 days his life support systems can support him. In Pikmin 2 (2004), he returns from the Pikmin planet to learn that Hocotate Freight is in severe debt. After discovering that some things he has brought back from the Pikmin planet are extremely valuable, his boss sends him and a co-worker, Louie, to the planet to find more of it in order to pay down the company's debt. Olimar is not the main character in Pikmin 3 (2013), but he appears in the game through his journal entries that instruct the player how to use the Pikmin as well as the game mechanics, and in the multiplayer mode "Bingo Battle". Player characters Alph, Brittany, and Charlie, who crash-landed on the planet shortly after Olimar, seek to locate him in order to retrieve a crucial piece of their ship, which he took mistaking it for treasure. The final level has the player characters attempt to rescue Olimar from the game's final boss, the Plasm Wraith. In the game's Nintendo Switch port, Pikmin 3 Deluxe (2020), Olimar appears as a playable character alongside Louie in an additional story campaign. Olimar reappears as the only playable character in the spin-off game Hey! Pikmin (2017), where he crash-lands on an unknown planet in his new ship, the S.S. Dolphin II. He learns that in order to bring his ship back in working order, he must collect 30,000 of the substance known as Sparklium. He soon re-encounters Pikmin, which he figures out he can use to carry Sparklium-rich treasures and seeds. Once the player gathers up 30,000 Sparklium, Olimar learns he must retrieve an essential component needed to repair the ship, the Sparklium Converter. However, it is revealed that it was eaten by the Beserk Leech Hydroe, a giant plant-like creature which he must fight. After defeating it and obtaining the converter, Olimar heads back to his home planet, Hocotate.

Other appearances
Olimar has been featured in four Super Smash Bros. games; he appears in Melee as a trophy, and in Brawl as a playable character, commanding his Pikmin to fight. He reappears in Super Smash Bros. for Nintendo 3DS and Wii U and Super Smash Bros. Ultimate. Although not a playable character, five Miis can reenact Olimar and four Pikmin (blue, red, yellow, and white, in that order of players) in Pikmin Adventure, a minigame in Nintendo Land. Olimar also appears in Super Mario Maker as a Mystery Mushroom costume.

Reception
Writing for The Observer, Tom Chatfield listed Olimar as one of his favorite 10 video game characters, describing him as "an intriguing character." GameDaily ranked him as fifteenth out of their top 20 anti-heroes, noting that despite the fact that he is "a good-natured spaceman", he also enslaves a race of aliens and forces them to work. In 2007, IGN speculated that he could appear in the next Super Smash Bros. title, stating "[b]y far one of the most likely and most requested recent year heroes is Olimar." They later featured him in a list of characters they most wanted to see on the Wii.

The portrayal of Olimar in the Super Smash Bros. series has also been praised. His announcement as a playable character was described by GamesRadar as "Best. Playable. Character. Announcement. Ever. [sic]". UGO Networks noted Olimar is the smallest character in Super Smash Bros. Brawl, and they recommended Olimar for "experienced players". They remarked that he is "cool" because he "doesn't actually fight, instead using Pikmin to do the dirty work." IGN commented that "Olimar alone is a pretty wimpy little sucker, but together with his Pikmin, they're a force to be reckoned with." Eurogamer's Tom Bramwell also noted his fighting style, saying he is "particularly eye-catching", and that Olimar's Final Smash is his favorite in the game. On the other hand, Thomas East from Official Nintendo Magazine ranked him fifth on his list of "Smash Bros. characters who need to be dropped for Wii U and 3DS", stating he "is a bit useless" since he uses the Pikmin to fight for him.

His replacement as the main character in Pikmin 3 has received both criticism and praise. Neoseeker described it as a "sad day indeed for Pikmin fans". On the other hand, it was called "a welcome change after two games of Olimar's blank canvas" by Edge. Jeremy Parish of Polygon ranked 73 fighters from Super Smash Bros. Ultimate "from garbage to glorious", listing Olimar as 32nd. Gavin Jasper of Den of Geek ranked Captain Olimar as 67th on his list of Super Smash Bros. Ultimate characters, stating that "I’ve never played any of the Pikmin games, but something about the design of Olimar, the Pikmin themselves, and their Smash stage just rubs me the wrong way."

References 

Extraterrestrial characters in video games
Fictional humanoids
Fictional space pilots
Male characters in video games
Nintendo protagonists
Pikmin
Silent protagonists
Nintendo characters
Olimar
Video game characters introduced in 2001
Video game mascots